The Pledge of Allegiance to the Flag is the pledge to the national flag of South Korea. The pledge is recited at flag ceremonies immediately before the South Korean national anthem.

History 
The current pledge was introduced on July 27, 2007. A previous pledge of allegiance was used from 1972 until 2007 and was introduced by then-president Park Chung-hee. Unlike the current pledge which pledges allegiance to the state of South Korea, the 1972 pledge rather pledged allegiance to the "Korean race," also known as the minjok.

In the mid-2000s, the pledging of allegiance to a "Korean race" (or "Korean ethnicity") was criticized by some people, specifically for being racist and "not appropriate at a time when South Korea is becoming a multiracial and multicultural society." This version of the pledge was discontinued in July 2007, during the presidency of Roh Moo-hyun, and replaced with different wording. Some right-wing South Koreans condemned the rewording of the country's pledge of allegiance, as it went against their ideology.

Similarly, until April 2011, the South Korean army's soldiers swore allegiance to the "Korean race" in their oaths of enlistment until that, too, was discontinued for similar reasons.

Text of the pledge

1972 version

Korean-language version

Korean-language transliteration
.

English translation
I strongly pledge, in front of the proud Korean flag, allegiance to my fatherland, to devote my body and soul to the eternal glory of the race.

Alternate English translation (with notations)
I firmly pledge, proudly in front of the Korean flag [Taegukgi], to loyally devote our body and soul to the eternal glory of the fatherland [joguk] and the race [minjok].

Literal English translation
I am firmly committed to fulfilling my allegiance by offering my body and mind for the endless glory of my fatherland and race before the proud Korean flag.

2007 version

Korean-language version (official version)

Korean-language transliteration
.

Official English-language translation
I pledge, in front of proud Taegeuk flag, allegiance to the Republic of Korea for the eternal glory of the country, liberty and freedom to the Republic of Korea.

Alternate English-language translation
I, standing before the noble Taegeuk flag, solemnly pledge allegiance to the Republic of Korea, to its glory, liberty and justice.

Literal English translation
I am firmly committed to my loyalty to the endless glory of the Republic of Korea that is free and just in front of a proud Taegeuk flag.

See also

Flag of South Korea
Korean ethnic nationalism
Oath of allegiance

References

External links

Flags of South Korea
South Korean culture
Korean nationalism
National symbols of South Korea
Oaths of allegiance
1972 documents
2007 documents